The 2001–02 I liga (then known as the II liga) is the 54th season of the I liga, the second highest division in the Polish football league system since its establishment in 1949. The league is operated by the Polish Football Association (PZPN). The league is contested by 20 teams who competing for promotion to the 2002–03 Ekstraklasa.

The regular season was played in a round-robin tournament. Each team played a total of 38 matches, half at home and half away. The champions and runners-up will receive automatic promotion while the 3rd- and 4th-placed teams will compete in Ekstraklasa's qualification play-offs. At the other end, the bottom six teams face automatic demotion to the II liga.

The season began on 21 July 2001, and concluded on 5 May 2002. After the 23rd matchday the league will be on winter break between 3 December 2001 and 1 March 2002.

Teams
The following teams competed in the I liga 2001–02:
Lech Poznań
Orlen Płock
Szczakowianka Jaworzno
Górnik Łęczna
GKS Bełchatów
Ceramika Opoczno
Hetman Zamość
Ruch Radzionków
Polar Wrocław
Tłoki Gorzyce
Arka Gdynia
Górnik Polkowice
Świt Nowy Dwór Mazowiecki
ŁKS Łódź
Jagiellonia Białystok
Hutnik Kraków
Zagłębie Sosnowiec
Odra Opole
Włókniarz Kietrz
KS Myszków

League table

Results

Top goalscorers

Ekstraklasa qualification play-offs 

Source: 90minut.pl – Baraże o udział w I lidze

Notes

References

External links
Poland - List of final tables (RSSSF)

2001–02 in Polish football
Pol
I liga seasons